"First Times" is a song by English singer-songwriter Ed Sheeran from his fifth studio album = (2021), appearing as the third track on its tracklisting. It was written and produced by Sheeran, Johnny McDaid and Fred Again. After the album's release, it charted at number 31, 50, 33, 126, 27 and 52 on Australia, Canada, Denmark, France, New Zealand and Sweden, respectively as well as charting at number 48 on the Global 200.

Background
Sheeran wrote the song after he took the inspiration from drinking beer with his wife backstage at Wembley Stadium. He shared that "First Times" was actually inspired by a quiet moment amid the chaos and heightened expectations of one of the biggest nights of his life—the evening he played Wembley Stadium. After all the excitement, he says it was a simple moment with wife Cherry Seaborn that really made it all real. He wrote “I was just on stage, and I was like ‘It’s actually just a concert. It was a good concert, but just a concert,’” he said. “Coming backstage, my wife giving me a beer, then me sitting down, and we chatted over a beer each; I felt everything. This is like real life.” He explained that's where the entire first verse of the song comes from. “That sort of took me back and I wrote this song thinking about all the simplest things that seemed so insignificant at the time, like our first glass of wine sitting on a step in Brooklyn opposite a pizza bar, and that at the time was just whatever.," he shared. "Now, it's become tradition. We go back to New York and that's what we do every single time." “Life is full of small things that seem so insignificant at the time, but they are massive in the grand scheme of things. We chase after these things in life that we think will fill the void, whereas the void is actually being filled by all these tiny, beautiful things," he continued. "You go ‘I need to do this thing because this is what I think will be the making of me and this is going to be it’ when actually it's all around you and you just have to take it in sometimes.”

Promotion and release
On 19 August 2021, Sheeran announced his fourth studio album, =, in which the song is listed on the tracklist. On 29 October 2021, "First Times" was released alongside other album tracks that appeared on the album =.

Lyric video
A lyric video for the song was uploaded on Sheeran's YouTube account on 29 October 2021 along with the other lyric videos of the songs that appeared on the tracklisting of =.

Credits and personnel

 Ed Sheeran – vocals, production, songwriting, writing
 Joe Rubel – strings programming
 Johnny McDaid – production, songwriting, writing
 Fred – production, bass, piano, songwriting, writing
 Parisi – additional strings
 Ashok Klouda – cello
 Tim Lowe – cello
 Victoria Harrild – cello
 Leon Bosch – double bass
 Matthew Sheeran – string arrangement
 Eoin Schmidt-Martin – viola
 Laurie Anderson – viola
 Rebecca Lowe – viola
 Gary Pomeroy – viola
 Meghan Cassidy – viola
 Ann Bielby – viola
 Kirsty Mangan – violin
 Kathy Gowers – violin
 Thomas Gould – violin
 Michael Jones – violin
 Marije Johnston – violin
 Jan Regulski – violin
 Anna Blackmur – violin
 Antonia Kesel – violin
 Beatrix Lovejoy – violin
 Warren Zielinksi – violin
 Samantha Wickramasinghe – violin
 Ciaran McCabe – violin
 Matthew Denton – violin
 Martyn Jackson – violin
 Hal Ritson – additional vocals, additional programming, bass
 Richard Adlam – additional programming
 Sam Roman – guitar
 Stuart Hawkes – mastering
 Mark "Spike" Stent – mixing
 Joe Rubel – string engineering
 Matt Glasbey – engineering
 Matt Wolach – mixing assistance
 Kieran Beardmore – mixing assistance
 Charlie Holmes – mixing assistance
 Marta Di Nozzi – engineering assistance
 Neil Dawes – engineering assistance

Charts

Certifications

References

2021 songs
Ed Sheeran songs
Song recordings produced by Ed Sheeran
Song recordings produced by Fred Again
Songs written by Ed Sheeran
Songs written by Fred Again
Songs written by Johnny McDaid